Dallas Mark Roberts (born May 10, 1970) is an American actor. He is best known for his role as Milton Mamet in the third season of AMC's The Walking Dead (2012-2013), Eliot Delson on Unforgettable, and Owen Cavanaugh on The Good Wife. He also starred in the Netflix comedy Insatiable.

Early life and education
Roberts was born and raised in Houston, Texas, where he attended Paul Revere Middle School and Robert E. Lee High School. He moved to Sarasota, Florida, where he graduated from Sarasota High School in 1988 and attended State College of Florida, Manatee-Sarasota. In 1990 Roberts was accepted to the Juilliard School in New York City, where he graduated in 1994 as a member of the Drama Division's Group 23.

Career
Roberts is primarily based in New York City, where he regularly appears in theatrical productions. Off-Broadway he has appeared in a revival of Lanford Wilson's Burn This, opposite Edward Norton and Catherine Keener; in Adam Rapp's Nocturne, for which he was nominated for a Drama Desk Award; and in Caryl Churchill's A Number, opposite Sam Shepard and later Arliss Howard, among others.   
 
Roberts' film work includes the screen adaptation of Michael Cunningham's A Home at the End of the World, and supporting roles in Walk the Line and The Notorious Bettie Page, among others. He had a regular role on the Showtime drama The L Word. He starred in the AMC original series Rubicon as Miles Fiedler, a genius intelligence analyst at a national think tank. He appeared in twelve episodes of The Good Wife as Alicia Florrick's (Julianna Margulies) gay brother, Owen. He has also made many appearances on Law & Order and its spinoff, Law & Order: Special Victims Unit. He also appeared in a crossover arc between SVU, Chicago P.D. and Chicago Fire as serial killer Gregory Yates.

From August 2012 through March 2013, Roberts was in the cast of The Walking Dead as scientist Milton Mamet, who studies "walkers" (zombies). From 2013 to 2015, he played Eliot Delson on Unforgettable.

Personal life
Roberts is married to scenic designer Christine Jones; the couple has two sons.

Filmography 
Law & Order (1995–2009)
A Home at the End of the World (2004)
Walk the Line (2005)
Winter Passing (2005)
The Notorious Bettie Page (2005)
Sisters (2006)
Flicka (2006)
The L Word (2006–2009)
Joshua (2007)
Lovely By Surprise (2007)
3:10 to Yuma (2007)
Ingenious (2009)
Shrink (2009)
Tell-Tale (2009)
The River Why (2010)
Rubicon (2010)
Law & Order: Criminal Intent (2010)
The Good Wife (2010–2016)
The Factory (2012)
The Grey (2012)
Elementary (2012)
The Walking Dead (2012–13) Season 3
Dallas Buyers Club (2013)
Shadow People (2013)
Unforgettable (2013–2015)
Chicago P.D. & Law & Order: Special Victims Unit (2015–2016 crossovers)
Mayhem (2017)My Friend Dahmer (2017)American Crime (2017)FBI (2018)Insatiable (2018–2019)
 Heartstrings (2019)
 Motherless Brooklyn (2019)
 American Rust (2021) 
 Big Sky (2022)
 Glass Onion: A Knives Out Mystery'' (2022)

References

External links
 
 
 

1970 births
21st-century American male actors
Actors from Sarasota, Florida
American male film actors
American male television actors
American male stage actors
Juilliard School alumni
Living people
Male actors from Houston
Male actors from Florida
Sarasota High School alumni
State College of Florida, Manatee–Sarasota alumni